Sean Dillon is a fictional Irish character who is the hero of a series of Jack Higgins novels.

Fictional biography
He is described in the stories as a short man and fair-haired. An aspiring actor at the age of 19, Dillon takes up being an IRA member, seeking revenge after his father is killed in Belfast in the crossfire between the British and the IRA. He is a protégé of Liam Devlin.

Born in 1952, he is a master assassin. When he was 19 his father was killed by British forces. He started as an IRA assassin but realised that the cause was not everything. After that he just was a gun for hire. He worked for almost everyone as long as they paid the right price.

He is taught several things by Devlin, including the 'eerie dog-whistle'. An excellent gunman and a good actor, he very soon earns the nickname "The Man of 1000 Faces" from the British, who dread him. He is noted for his part in the Downing Street bomb blast, which fails to kill or injure anyone. His disapproval of the IRA's indiscriminate bombings of innocent civilians prompts him to abandon the cause and offer himself out as a mercenary for hire, working indiscriminately for the PLO and the Israelis, the Red Brigade, and even the KGB. Although the British are desperate to catch him, he has never been to jail. For more than 20 years the elusive and resourceful Dillon—who shunned the publicity favoured by other terrorists—slipped through the fingers of the authorities on every continent. He is finally caught by the Serbs while running medicine for children into Bosnia.

It is revealed that the shipment contained Stinger missiles without his knowledge, and he is sentenced to death. Dillon is plucked out of prison by Brigadier Charles Ferguson of the elite British Security Service antiterrorist unit Group 4, who offers him a clean slate in exchange for his services. Soon after joining Group 4, it is revealed that Dillon's capture by the Serbs was actually set up by Brigadier Charles Ferguson.

Dillon — an expert pilot and scuba diver as well as a master of disguise and languages — subsequently becomes Ferguson's most effective agent, at one point even foiling an assassination attempt upon the prime minister and the president of the United States. Dillon soon meets Ferguson's right-hand woman Hannah Bernstein, and is slightly romantically inclined towards her. He also befriends the United States president's right-hand man, Blake Johnson, and famous London gangsters Harry Salter and his nephew Billy Salter.

Tastes 
Dillon's favourite handgun is a Walther PPK with Carswell silencer and his favourite rifle is an AK-47. His preferred explosive is Semtex. His favorite 'hide-out' gun is a .25 Colt strapped to his ankle.

Dillon's drink of choice is non-vintage Krug champagne, due to the grape mix, and his second drink of choice is Bushmills Irish whiskey.

Appearances 

 Eye of the Storm (1992)
 Thunder Point (1993)
 On Dangerous Ground (1994)
 Angel of Death (1995)
 Drink with the Devil (1996)
 The President's Daughter (1997)
 The White House Connection (1999)
 Day of Reckoning (2000)
 Edge of Danger (2001)
 Midnight Runner (2002)
 Bad Company (2003)
 Dark Justice (2004)
 Without Mercy (2005)
 The Killing Ground (2007)
 Rough Justice (2008)
 A Darker Place (2009)
 Wolf at the Door (2009)
 The Judas Gate (2010)
 A Devil Is Waiting (2012)
 The Death Trade (2013)
 Rain on the Dead (2014)
 The Midnight Bell (2017)

In other media

Television films
 Sean Dillon was portrayed by Rob Lowe in On Dangerous Ground (1996) and Midnight Man (1997).
 He was portrayed by Kyle MacLachlan in Windsor Protocol (1997) and Thunder Point (1998).

References

External links 

Provisional Irish Republican Army
Fictional secret agents and spies
Novels by Jack Higgins